Paul Rostock (18 January 1892 – 17 June 1956) was a German official, surgeon, and university professor. He was chief of the Office for Medical Science and Research (Amtschef der Dienststelle Medizinische Wissenschaft und Forschung) under Third Reich Commissioner Karl Brandt and a full professor, medical doctorate, medical superintendent of the University of Berlin Surgical Clinic.

Biography

Rostock was born in Kranz, Meseritz district, German Empire. He studied medicine in Greifswald and completed his medical doctorate at Jena in 1921. He received his medical license and became an intern at the University of Jena Surgical Clinic. From 1927 to 1933, Rostock was assistant medical director at Bergmannsheil Hospital in Bochum and worked with Karl Brandt, who was at that time an intern there. In 1933, Rostock took on the position of medical superintendent in Berlin and in 1941 became associate professor and director of the University of Berlin Surgical Clinic in Ziegel Street, where Karl Brandt was then working as assistant medical director. Rostock became dean of the medical faculty at the University of Berlin in 1942.

Rostock's military medical career began in 1939 with a position as Consulting Surgeon to the Army. In 1943, General Commissioner Karl Brandt chose Rostock as his deputy and representative in the Medical Science Research Department. Rostock joined the National Socialist German Workers Party on May 1, 1937 (No. 5,917,621) and the National Socialist German Physicians Association on February 20, 1940 (Nr. 31,569).

Doctor's Trial and Later Years

Rostock was a defendant in the Doctors' Trial. Because of his very high position, Rostock was charged with complicity in several series of human experiments on concentration camp prisoners. He was acquitted and released in August 1947.

He immediately began to work on documentation of the Doctors' Trial, with the goal of presenting the trial to the public from another perspective. Rostock never finished this project.

In 1948, Rostock began working as medical supervisor of Versehrten Hospital in Possenhofen. He then worked as the medical supervisor of Versorgungs Hospital in Bayreuth, from 1953 to his death at age 64 in Bad Tölz.

See also
Doctors' Trial
Nazi human experimentation

References

1892 births
1956 deaths
People from the Province of Posen
Nazi Party officials
Physicians in the Nazi Party
People indicted for war crimes
People acquitted by the United States Nuremberg Military Tribunals
German surgeons
20th-century surgeons